Abraha Asfaha is Eritrea's Minister of Public Works and Construction, a post he has held since independence.

References

External links
Picture of Abraha Kassa

Living people
Year of birth missing (living people)
People's Front for Democracy and Justice politicians
Government ministers of Eritrea